Events from the year 1666 in France

Incumbents
 Monarch – Louis XIV

Events
13 January – French traveller Jean-Baptiste Tavernier arrives in Dhaka, and meets Shaista Khan.
4 June – Molière's comedy The Misanthrope is premièred at the Théâtre du Palais-Royal in Paris, by the King's Players.
22 December – The French Academy of Sciences, founded by the king, first meets.
The Institution libre du Sacré-Cœur at Tourcoing is founded.

Births

15 February – Claude-Élisée de Court de La Bruyère, naval officer (d. 1752)
18 June – Jeanne Delanoue, saint in the Roman Catholic Church (d. 1736)
2 October – Marie Anne de Bourbon, Légitimée de France, Duchess of La Vallière (d. 1739)

Full date missing
Léopold Durand, architect (d. 1746)
Jean d'Estrées, priest and politician (d. 1718)
Philippe Grandjean, type engraver (d. 1714)

Deaths

16 February – Jean de Lauson, governor (b. 1584)
26 February – Armand de Bourbon, Prince of Conti, nobleman (b. 1629) 
23 September – François Mansart, architect (b. 1598)
23 September – Hannibal Sehested, Dano-Norwegian statesman and diplomat (b. 1609) 
3 November – Henri-Auguste de Loménie, comte de Brienne, politician (b. 1594)

Full date missing
Louis de La Forge, philosopher (b. 1632)

See also

References

1660s in France